Garry Richard Rushby Hart, Baron Hart of Chilton (29 June 1940 – 3 August 2017), was a British Labour politician. From 1998 to 2007, he was Expert and then Special Adviser to the Lord Chancellor, first Lord Irvine of Lairg and then Lord Falconer of Thoroton.

Education
Hart was educated at Northgate Grammar School for Boys, Ipswich and University College London

Professional career
Before entering public service Hart was a highly successful planning solicitor with Herbert Smith. His appointment in 1998 was the subject of some controversy, but he was regarded as having a very beneficial influence on Lord Irvine, and serving also as a source of sound advice to Lord Falconer when the latter became Lord Chancellor in 2003. Hart helped guide the Lord Chancellor's Department as it became the Department for Constitutional Affairs, and again as it became the Ministry of Justice.

He was created a life peer on 4 June 2004 taking the title Baron Hart of Chilton, of Chilton in the County of Suffolk.

When Lord Falconer resigned in 2007, Lord Hart left his appointment. He had not spoken in the House of Lords following his peerage as this was considered inconsistent with his Government role. However, in 2007 he seconded the motion on the Queen's Speech in a well received contribution.

Personal life
Lord Hart married first, in 1966, Paula Shepherd. They had two sons and a daughter. The marriage was dissolved in 1986.
He married, secondly, in 1986, Valerie Davies, a lawyer. They had twin daughters.

Lord Hart lived in Chilton Hall in Suffolk with his second wife. Lord Hart was also godfather to Tony Blair's daughter Kathryn.

Arms

References

Links

Profile, hansard.millbanksystems.com; accessed 4 August 2017.

Labour Party (UK) life peers
1940 births
2017 deaths
English solicitors
People educated at Northgate Grammar School, Ipswich
Deaths from cancer in England
20th-century English lawyers
Life peers created by Elizabeth II